Intech Contracting LLC is a Kentucky-based construction contracting company that specializes in bridge repair and restoration, inspection support, and related services.

The firm is notable for finally completing the painting of the John F. Kennedy Memorial Bridge in Louisville, marking the end of nearly a decade of public controversy. Two previous contractors had failed to complete the job amidst a bribery scandal and disputes with state officials. Similarly, the company completed painting the Corpus Christi Harbor Bridge after a previous company's contract was canceled.

Intech has also contributed to the restoration efforts of several highly visible or historic bridges, including many of the surviving wooden covered bridges in Kentucky and the John A. Roebling Suspension Bridge in Cincinnati.

Notable bridge rehabilitation projects
Astoria-Megler Bridge
Brent Spence Bridge
Corpus Christi Harbor Bridge
John A. Roebling Suspension Bridge
John F. Kennedy Memorial Bridge
Martin Luther King Jr. Memorial (Gulfgate) Bridge
Mathews Bridge
Various Historic Covered Bridges (see below)

Covered bridges
Intech has restored over half of the 13 wooden covered bridges in Kentucky and others elsewhere.

References

Companies based in Lexington, Kentucky